Pagosa Springs High School is a public high school located in Pagosa Springs, Colorado. It is a part of Archuleta County School District 50-JT.

The district includes most of Archuleta County. A portion is in Hinsdale County, where it serves Piedra.

History
Pagosa Springs High School moved into their current building in 1998.

Athletics

Teams
Pagosa Spring's athletic teams are nicknamed the Pirates and the school's colors are black, white, and gold. Pagosa Springs teams compete in the following sports:

Baseball
Boys basketball
Boys golf
Boys soccer
Cross country
Football
Girls basketball
Girls soccer
Swimming
Track
Volleyball

State championships

Boys basketball
1960 Colorado Class B State Champions
2013 Colorado Class 3A State Champions
Girls basketball
2015 Colorado Class 3A State Champions

Demographics
69% of the student population at Pagosa Springs High School identify as Caucasian, 15% identify as Hispanic, 12% identify as American Indian/Alaskin Native, 2% identity as Asian, 1% identify as multiracial, 0.5% identify as African American, and 0.2% identify as Hawaiian Native/Pacific Islander. The student body makeup is 51% male and 49% female.

In 2018 some families dissatisfied with the schools of Dulce Independent Schools in Dulce, New Mexico enrolled their children in Archuleta school district schools. There were 31 students going to Pagosa Springs High from the Dulce area. Linda Reed, the superintendent, stated "people have been doing that for years."

References

External links
 

Public high schools in Colorado
Buildings and structures in Archuleta County, Colorado